Rabie Belgherri (born October 7, 1977 in Maghnia) is an Algerian football player. He currently plays for WA Tlemcen in the Algerian Ligue Professionnelle 1.

Honours
 Won the Algerian Cup once with WA Tlemcen in 2002
 Finalist of the Algerian Cup once with WA Tlemcen in 2008

External links
 DZFoot Profile
 

1977 births
Living people
People from Maghnia
Algerian footballers
Algerian Ligue Professionnelle 1 players
WA Tlemcen players
IRB Maghnia players
Association football midfielders
21st-century Algerian people